Winnsboro is a city in, and the parish seat of Franklin Parish, Louisiana, United States. As of 2020, its population was 4,862.

History 
Franklin Parish was created on March 1, 1843, from portions of Ouachita, Catahoula, and Madison parishes through the efforts of Louisiana Senator John Winn. Land for a centrally located parish seat, Winnsborough (later Winnsboro), was purchased in 1844. It was designated as the parish seat of government in 1846 and incorporated on March 18, 1902.

Early Winnsboro City records show that the telephone came to Winnsboro in 1905; electricity in 1914; and water and sewer service in 1923. In 1924, a volunteer fire department was formed. Most of the community's streets were hard surfaced after 1950.

Geography 

Climate

Demographics 

As of the 2020 United States census, there were 4,862 people, 1,504 households, and 1,007 families residing in the city.

Economy 

The economic base of Winnsboro consists of companies in the apparel, boat manufacturing, bottling and food products industries, aviation, healthcare, agriculture and agricultural related industries. There is a large grain elevator.

Arts and culture

Princess Theatre

The Princess Theatre in Winnsboro was established in 1907, and close in 1985.  It was later refurbished.

Education

Public schools 

Public education in Winnsboro is managed by the Franklin Parish School Board. There are two schools:

 Franklin Parish High School and Winnsboro Elementary School

Private schools 
 Franklin Academy was founded in 1970. 
 Family Community Christian School provides education from pre-kindergarten to 12th grade.

Higher education 
Louisiana Technical College's Northeast Louisiana Campus is located in Winnsboro.

Infrastructure

Healthcare 
Winnsboro is the home of the only hospital located in Franklin Parish. Franklin Medical Center has been a part of Franklin Parish since 1970. The hospital is a 39-bed acute care facility. There are four health clinics owned by Franklin Medical Center located in Franklin and Tensas parishes.

National Guard 
921st Engineer Company (Horizontal), part of the 528th Engineer Battalion which belongs to the 225th Engineer Brigade, is located in Winnsboro.

Notable people 
 Fred Carter, Jr., rock and roll guitarist and singer
 Ralph E. King, physician and state senator from 1944 to 1952 and 1956 to 1960
 Caleb Martin, American football player
 Anthony McFarland, professional football player and ESPN commentator
 John Moffitt, 2004 Olympic silver medalist
 Woody Sauldsberry, NBA player
 Chet D. Traylor, Associate Justice on the Louisiana Supreme Court
 Calvin A. H. Waller, Lieutenant General, United States Army; Deputy Commander-in-Chief, Operation Desert Storm
 Sammy White, professional football player

References

External links 

 Winnsboro–Franklin Parish Chamber of Commerce

Cities in Louisiana
Cities in Franklin Parish, Louisiana
Parish seats in Louisiana